This page is a list of 2021 UCI WorldTeams. These 19 teams are competing in the 2021 UCI World Tour.

Teams overview

Riders

AG2R Citroën Team

Astana–Premier Tech

Bora–Hansgrohe

Cofidis

Deceuninck–Quick-Step

EF Education–Nippo

Groupama–FDJ

Ineos Grenadiers

Intermarché–Wanty–Gobert Matériaux

Israel Start-Up Nation

Lotto–Soudal

Movistar Team

Team Bahrain Victorious

Team BikeExchange

Team DSM

Team Jumbo–Visma

Team Qhubeka NextHash

Trek–Segafredo

UAE Team Emirates

Notes

References

See also 

 2021 in men's road cycling
 List of 2021 UCI ProTeams and Continental teams
 List of 2021 UCI Women's Teams and riders

2021 in men's road cycling
2021